Dawn Career Institute, located in Newark, Delaware, is a private post-secondary institution of higher education serving Delaware, south-central and south-eastern Pennsylvania, and northern Maryland. The institute offers both campus-based and online career-focused diploma programs, leading to professional certifications and licenses in a variety of healthcare and wellness fields.  Dawn Career Institute was founded April 1, 1976 as an aviation school.  On February 12, 1999, the school became Dawn Training Centre, and in October 2009, the school changed its name again to Dawn Career Institute. The campus moved to its current location at 252 Chapman Road, Newark, DE on December 22, 2017. This 25,047-square-foot facility provides updated classroom and lab spaces, as well as a brand new computer lab, and dedicated areas for the Learning Resource Center and Career Services Department as a center hub of the campus.

DCI is accredited by the Accrediting Commission of Career Schools and Colleges (ACCSC). It is approved by the State of Delaware Department of Education as a Private Business and Trade School and for Veteran's (VA) training. The institution is also approved by the U.S. Department of Education to administer Title IV Pell Grants, Direct Student Loans (DSL), and Parent Loans for Undergraduate Students (PLUS).

Accreditation

Dawn Career Institute is accredited by the Accrediting Commission of Career Schools and Colleges (ACCSC). It is approved by the State of Delaware Department of Education as a Private Business and Trade School and for Veteran's (VA) training. The institution is also approved by the U.S. Department of Education to administer Title IV Pell Grants, Direct Student Loans (DSL), and Parent Loans for Undergraduate Students (PLUS).

Programs
Programs include Advanced Class A CDL Driving, Advanced Esthetician, Class A CDL Driving, Dental Assistant, HVAC Technician, Medical Assisting, Medical Billing & Coding Specialist, and Nursing Assistant.

External links
 Dawn Career Institute Official Web Site
 Dawn Career Institute History
 Accrediting Commission of Career Schools and Colleges of Technology

Private universities and colleges in Delaware
Educational institutions established in 1976
Education in New Castle County, Delaware
Buildings and structures in Wilmington, Delaware
1976 establishments in Delaware